This list concerns blood type distribution between countries and regions. Blood type (also called a blood group) is a classification of blood, based on the presence and absence of antibodies and inherited antigenic substances on the surface of red blood cells (RBCs). These antigens may be proteins, carbohydrates, glycoproteins, or glycolipids, depending on the blood group system.

ABO and Rh distribution by country

Blood group B has its highest frequency in the Middle East, where it ranks as the largest share of the population. In Southeast Asia its share of the population is lowest, especially in Indonesia, secondarily in East Asia, Northern Asia and neighboring Central Asia, and its incidence diminishes both towards the east and the west, falling to single-digit percentages in Netherlands, Norway, Portugal and Switzerland. It is believed to have been entirely absent from Native American and Australian Aboriginal populations prior to the arrival of Europeans in those areas.

Blood group A is associated with high frequencies in Europe, especially in Scandinavia and Central Europe, although its highest frequencies occur in some Australian Aboriginal populations and the Blackfoot Indians of Montana, USA.

Maps of ABO alleles among native populations 
In the ABO blood group system, there are three alleles:  i, IA, and IB. As both IA and IB are dominant over i, only ii people have type O blood. Individuals with IAIA or IAi have type A blood, and individuals with IBIB or IBi have type B. Those with IAIB have type AB.

See also 
 ABO blood group system
 Blood type

References 

Blood
Human genetics